= Ragannaguda =

- Village
- Country: India
- State: Telangana

Languages
  - Official: Telugu
- Time zone: UTC+5:30 (IST)
- Telephone code: 08415
- Vehicle registration: TS 07 X XXXX
- Sex ratio: 1:1(approx) ♂/♀
- Website: telangana.gov.in

Ragannaguda is a village in Rangareddy district in Telangana, India.
